George Charrette (June 6, 1867 – February 7, 1938) was an enlisted man and later officer in the United States Navy who received the Medal of Honor for his heroism during the Spanish–American War.

Biography
Charrette was born in Lowell, Massachusetts, on June 6, 1867. He enlisted in the United States Navy September 24, 1884. As a Gunner's Mate third class, on June 2, 1898, he volunteered with seven others to sink  under heavy Spanish fire across the entrance to the harbor of Santiago, Cuba, thus bottling up the enemy fleet. Taken prisoner by the Spanish, Charrette was exchanged July 6, 1898. He was awarded the Medal of Honor for extraordinary heroism, although his name was misspelled as "George Charette" on the citation.

Charrette was warranted as a gunner on June 15, 1898, and was promoted to chief gunner on June 15, 1904.  During World War I, he was commissioned lieutenant on July 1, 1918, and retired from the Navy in 1925.

He died February 7, 1938, in Lowell, Massachusetts, and was buried in Arlington National Cemetery, Arlington County, Virginia.

Awards
Sampson Medal
Spanish Campaign Medal
Victory Medal

Namesake
In 1943, the destroyer  was named in his honor.

See also
 List of Medal of Honor recipients
 List of Medal of Honor recipients for the Spanish–American War

References

1867 births
1938 deaths
Burials at Arlington National Cemetery
United States Navy Medal of Honor recipients
Spanish–American War prisoners of war held by Spain
American military personnel of the Spanish–American War
United States Navy officers
People from Lowell, Massachusetts
Spanish–American War recipients of the Medal of Honor
Military personnel from Massachusetts